Carles Marco may refer to:

Carles Marco (basketball) (born 1974), retired Spanish basketball player
Carles Marco (footballer) (born 2000), Spanish footballer